David Maurice Levett (1844–1914) was an American composer.

Levett was born in New York City. He studied music in New York, Germany, and France, and graduated from the Leipzig Conservatory in 1871. He taught from 1876 in New Brunswick, N. J., Jacksonville, 111., and Chicago, settling in New York in 1885. After 1900 he taught at the College of Music. In 1898–1900 he was in the faculty of the Stern Conservatory in Berlin. He composed several symphonic poems including Harlequinade and Memories, a romance and a serenade for violin and piano.

References

1844 births
1914 deaths
19th-century classical composers
20th-century classical composers
American male classical composers
American classical composers
19th-century American composers
20th-century American composers
20th-century American male musicians
19th-century American male musicians